Tom and Jerry are cat and mouse cartoon characters, Tom Cat and Jerry Mouse, that debuted in 1940. The names are derived from a humoristic novel originally created by Pierce Egan in 1821. 

Tom and Jerry may also refer to:

Cartoon works

Featuring the cat and mouse

Animated TV shows 
 The Tom and Jerry Show (1975 TV series)
 The Tom and Jerry Show (2014 TV series)
 The Tom and Jerry Comedy Show, a 1980 television series
 Tom & Jerry Kids, a 1990 television series
 Tom and Jerry Tales, a 2006 television series

Movies of Tom and Jerry 
 Tom and Jerry: The Movie, a 1992 feature film
 Tom and Jerry: The Magic Ring, a 2001 American direct-to-video animated film
 Tom and Jerry: Blast Off to Mars, a 2005 American animated film
 Tom and Jerry: The Fast and the Furry, a 2005 American animated film
 Tom and Jerry: Shiver Me Whiskers, a 2006 American direct-to-video animated film
 Tom and Jerry: A Nutcracker Tale, a 2007 American direct-to-video animated film
 Tom and Jerry Meet Sherlock Holmes, a 2010 American direct-to-video animated film
 Tom and Jerry and the Wizard of Oz, a 2011 American direct-to-video animated film
 Tom and Jerry: Robin Hood and His Merry Mouse, a 2012 American direct-to-video animated film
 Tom and Jerry's Giant Adventure, a 2013 American direct-to-video animated film
 Tom and Jerry: The Lost Dragon, a 2014 American direct-to-video animated film
 Tom and Jerry: Spy Quest, a 2015 American direct-to-video animated film
 Tom and Jerry: Back to Oz, a 2016 American direct-to-video animated film
 Tom and Jerry: Willy Wonka and the Chocolate Factory, 2017 American direct-to-video animated film
 Tom & Jerry, a 2021 American live-action/computer-animated slapstick comedy film
 Tom and Jerry: Cowboy Up!, a 2022 American direct-to-video animated film
 Tom and Jerry: Snowman's Land, a 2022 American direct-to-video animated film

Video Games
 List of Tom and Jerry video games, a list of video games

Others
 Tom and Jerry (Van Beuren), two men in a series of cartoons made in 1931–1933

Other fictional characters
 Corinthian Tom and Jerry Hawthorn, the original incarnation of "Tom and Jerry", in the novel Life in London by Pierce Egan
 Tom Good and Jerry Leadbetter, in the UK sitcom The Good Life
 Tom and Jerry Yeo, brothers in the Singaporean film I Not Stupid Too

Non-cartoon works
 Tom and Jerry, or Life in London, 1821 play by William Moncrieff based on Pierce Egan's novel
 Tom & Jerry (album), by Simon & Garfunkel
Tom & Jerry (1996 film), an Indian Malayalam-language comedy film
Tom and Jerry (Nigerian film), a 2015 Nigerian film
 Jerry and Tom, a 1998 American film

Performing pairs
 Tom and Jerry (fl. 1956 to 1959), (Tom Graph and Jerry Landis) later known as Simon & Garfunkel
 Tom and Jerry (guitarists) (fl. early 1960s), Tommy Tomlinson and Jerry Kennedy
 Tom Cheek and Jerry Howarth, radio announcers for the Toronto Blue Jays baseball team from 1981 to 2005
 Tom & Jerry, an alias used by the electronic music duo 4hero.

In other uses
 Tom and Jerry (drink), a mixed drink containing eggnog and rum
 Tom and Jerry engine, a type of pump used to keep dry the mine workings at the Great Orme.
 Tom and Jerry, the nicknames for two satellites involved in the Gravity Recovery and Climate Experiment.
 Tom and Jerry, 32-bit processors used in the Atari Jaguar
 Tom and Jerry, a nickname for a beerhouse.
 Tom and Jerry, a traditional bluegrass tune for fiddle (violin).

See also
"Tom & Gerri", episode of Inside No. 9